The National Mediation Board (NMB) is an independent agency of the United States government that coordinates labor-management relations within the U.S. railroads and airlines industries.

History
The board was established by the 1934 amendments to the Railway Labor Act of 1926 and is headed by a three-person panel of Presidential appointees.

NMB programs provide an integrated dispute resolution process to meet the statutory objective of minimizing strikes and other work stoppages in the airline and railroad industries. The NMB's integrated processes specifically are designed to promote three statutory goals:

 The prompt and orderly resolution of disputes arising out of the negotiation of new or revised collective bargaining agreements;
 The effectuation of employee rights of self-organization where a representation dispute exists; and
 The prompt and orderly resolution of disputes over the interpretation or application of existing agreements.

Contracts
Under the Railway Labor Act, an airline or railroad union contract does not expire; it remains in force and amendable until a new contract is ratified by the union members or either side exercises "self-help," which could be a strike by employees or a lockout by management. Before this can happen, the NMB-appointed mediator must declare an impasse in negotiations, which starts a 30-day cooling off period, during which negotiations continue. Once the 30-day period has passed, either side is free to exercise self-help, unless the President authorizes a Presidential Emergency Board, which issues non-binding recommendations followed by another 30-day cooling off period. The US Congress also has the power to impose a contract, but that has rarely happened in recent years.

Board members
The Board is composed of 3 members, nominated by the President of the United States, with the advice and consent of the Senate, for a term of three years. By statute 45 U.S.C. § 154, “not more than two [...] shall be of the same political party”. At the end of a term of office a member may continue to serve until a successor is appointed or they are renominated.

See also
 Title 29 of the Code of Federal Regulations
 Newlands Labor Act
 National Labor Relations Board
 Federal Mediation and Conciliation Service (United States)

References

External links
 
 National Mediation Board in the Federal Register

1934 establishments in the United States
Government agencies established in 1934
Independent agencies of the United States government
Labor relations boards
Mediation